vnStat is a network utility for the Linux operating system. It uses a command line interface. vnStat command is a console-based network traffic monitor. It keeps a log of hourly, daily and monthly network traffic for the selected interface(s) but is not a packet sniffer. The traffic information is analyzed from the proc filesystem. That way vnStat can be used even without root permissions.

History 

vnStat is a console-based network traffic monitor that uses the network interface statistics provided by the kernel as information source. This means that vnStat won't actually be sniffing any traffic and also ensures light use of system resources. vnStat had an Initial public release in 23-Sep-2002 (version 1.0) by Teemu Toivola.

On 8 March 2004 its webpage moved to https://humdi.net/vnstat/ and a man page was included.

On 4 November 2006 was included in Debian for Testing Watch  and on 17 November 2006 was removed and next day was accepted 1.4-4 version. On 20 February 2010 was accepted 1.10-0.1 version in Debian. Nowadays Debian keeps a full history about vnstat by using a Rich Site Summary.

On 26 April 2012 was included in Ubuntu 12.04 Precise Pangolin

On 16 February 2017 a 1.17 version was released.

Control keys 

vnStat is a command line program and uses sames control keys, for example,  stops live monitoring.

See also 

 Free network management software

References

External links 

 
 Official repository: https://github.com/vergoh/vnstat

Linux network-related software
Free software programmed in C
Console applications